Sumusta is a city in the Beni Suef Governorate, Egypt. Its population was estimated at 63,000 people in 2020.

References 

Populated places in Beni Suef Governorate
Cities in Egypt